Events from the year 1969 in South Korea.

Incumbents
President: Park Chung-hee 
Prime Minister: Chung Il-kwon

Events
 August 8 – MBC Television officially launched service to nationwide.
 End of Korean DMZ Conflict.

Births

  8 August - Song Sung-il, Greco-Roman wrestler (d. 1995)
 14 September - Bong Joon-ho, director and screenwriter
 29 September - Cho Youn-jeong, archer
  6 October - Hyun Jung-hwa, table tennis player

See also
List of South Korean films of 1969
Years in Japan
Years in North Korea

References

 
South Korea
Years of the 20th century in South Korea
1960s in South Korea
South Korea